Neumarkt is a Stadtbahn station in Innenstadt, Cologne. The station is divided in an overground part for low-floor trains and an underground part for high-floor trains. It is important as a junction between the low-floor east-western lines (1, 7, 9) and the high-floor lines (3, 4, 16, 18).

Overground station 

The overground part consists mainly of two low-floor platforms on the Neumarkt square used by the East-western trains of lines 1, 7, and 9. Although most of the trains don't terminate here in regular service, there is a loop surrounding the place. This loop, used for example by additional trains to the Stadium and by line 7 in the late evenings uses two additional platforms at the northern end of the Neumarkt. From the main platforms, there are stairs leading to the underground part of the station and to the HUGO-Passage.

As part of improvements to the East-West axis, which in peak hours operates the maximum of 30 trains per hour per direction, the platforms will be lengthened to 90m to accommodate new longer trains. Building a new tunnel for lines 1, 7 and 9 is also considered, but it would only minimally improve service, and would be difficult to build due to the existing tunnels, which were not made for a second set of tunnels below them.

Adjacent to the station is also a bus stop. All bus lines terminate here, the stop for exit is near the main platforms, the entrance platform near the platforms in the loop.

Underground station 
The underground station is used by the high-floor trains of lines 3, 4, 16, and 18. There are two side-platforms, but the station does not offer any operational infrastructure.

When this station was opened, it also used low-floor platforms as also trams called here. When the platforms were elevated to allow step-free access to the trains, the escalators were not replaced, so from the platforms, a ramp was built to get to the level of the lower end of the escalators.

Currently the underground part of the station is also operating at maximum capacity with train headways being 2 minutes, but with the construction of the North-South Stadtbahn, line 16 will avoid the congested city center tunnel and instead follow the new tunnel to Dom/Hbf.

HUGO-Passage 

The HUGO-Passage is an underground concourse connecting both parts of the Station and the nearby Schildergasse. Inside, there are shops as well as a service center of the Kölner Verkehrs-Betriebe (Cologne Transport Authority).

The name HUGO-Passage is usually shown by a green H in a yellow circle, the German sign for a tram stop (Haltestelle) representing the overground station, a white U in a blue box, the German sign for an underground (U-Bahn), and the word GO, depicting the possibilities for walkers to use the passage to avoid waiting at traffic lights.

Notable places nearby 
 Käthe Kollwitz Museum
 Rautenstrauch Joest Museum
 Schnütgen Museum 
 Church of St. Cäcilien Basilica 
 Church of St. Aposteln

See also 
 List of Cologne KVB stations

References

External links 
 Layout of the station (PDF, German)

Cologne KVB stations
Innenstadt, Cologne
Railway stations in Germany opened in 1969
Cologne-Bonn Stadtbahn stations